Triiodothyronine, also known as T3, is a thyroid hormone.  It affects almost every physiological process in the body, including growth and development, metabolism, body temperature, and heart rate.

Production of T3 and its prohormone thyroxine (T4) is activated by thyroid-stimulating hormone (TSH), which is released from the anterior pituitary gland.  This pathway is part of a closed-loop feedback process: Elevated concentrations of T3, and T4 in the blood plasma inhibit the production of TSH in the anterior pituitary gland. As concentrations of these hormones decrease, the anterior pituitary gland increases production of TSH, and by these processes, a feedback control system stabilizes the level of thyroid hormones in the bloodstream.

T3 is the true hormone. Its effects on target tissues are roughly four times more potent than those of T4. Of the thyroid hormone that is produced, just about 20% is T3, whereas 80% is produced as T4. Roughly 85% of the circulating T3 is later formed in the liver and anterior pituitary by removal of the iodine atom from the carbon atom number five of the outer ring of T4. In any case, the concentration of T3 in the human blood plasma is about one-fortieth that of T4. The half-life of T3 is about 2.5 days. The half-life of T4 is about 6.5 days.

Production

Synthesis from T4 

T3 is the more metabolically active hormone produced from T4. T4 is deiodinated by three deiodinase enzymes to produce the more-active triiodothyronine:
 Type I present in liver, kidney, thyroid, and (to a lesser extent) pituitary; it accounts for 80% of the deiodination of T4.
 Type II present in CNS, pituitary, brown adipose tissue, and heart vessel, which is predominantly intracellular. In the pituitary, it mediates negative feedback on thyroid-stimulating hormone.
 Type III present in placenta, CNS, and hemangioma.  This deiodinase converts T4 into reverse T3, which, unlike T3, is inactive.

T4 is synthesised in the thyroid follicular cells as follows.
 The sodium-iodide symporter transports two sodium ions across the basement membrane of the follicular cells along with an iodine ion. This is a secondary active transporter that utilises the concentration gradient of Na+ to move I− against its concentration gradient.
 I− is moved across the apical membrane into the colloid of the follicle.
 Thyroperoxidase oxidises I− to form the I radical.
 The thyroperoxidase iodinates the tyrosyl residues of the thyroglobulin within the colloid. The thyroglobulin was synthesised in the ER of the follicular cell and secreted into the colloid.
 Thyroid-stimulating hormone (TSH) released from the anterior pituitary gland binds the TSH receptor (a Gs protein-coupled receptor) on the basolateral membrane of the cell and stimulates the endocytosis of the colloid.
 The endocytosed vesicles fuse with the lysosomes of the follicular cell. The lysosomal enzymes cleave the T4 from the iodinated thyroglobulin.
 These vesicles are then exocytosed, releasing the thyroid hormones.

Direct synthesis 
The thyroid gland also produces small amounts of T3 directly.  In the follicular lumen, tyrosine residues become iodinated. This reaction requires hydrogen peroxide. Iodine bonds carbon 3 or carbon 5 of tyrosine residues of thyroglobulin in a process called organification of iodine. The iodination of specific tyrosines yields monoiodotyrosine (MIT) and diiodotyrosine (DIT). One MIT and one DIT are enzymatically coupled to form T3. The enzyme is thyroid peroxidase.

The small amount of T3 could be important because different tissues have different sensitivities to T4 due to differences in deiodinase ubiquitination in different tissues link.  This once again raises the question if T3 should be included in thyroid hormone replacement therapy (THRT).

Mechanism of action 
T3 and T4 bind to nuclear receptors (thyroid hormone receptors). T3 and T4, although being lipophilic, are not able to passively diffuse through the phospholipid bilayers of target cells, instead relying on transmembrane iodothyronine transporters. The lipophilicity of T3 and T4 requires their binding to the protein carrier thyroid-binding protein (TBG) (thyroxine-binding globulins, thyroxine binding prealbumins, and albumins) for transport in the blood. The thyroid receptors bind to response elements in gene promoters, thus enabling them to activate or inhibit transcription. The sensitivity of a tissue to T3 is modulated through the thyroid receptors.

Transportation 

T3 and T4 are carried in the blood, bound to plasma proteins. This has the effect of increasing the half-life of the hormone and decreasing the rate at which it is taken up by peripheral tissues. There are three main proteins that the two hormones are bound to. Thyroxine-binding globulin (TBG) is a glycoprotein that has a higher affinity for T4 than for T3. Transthyretin is also a glycoprotein, but only carries T4, with hardly any affinity at all for T3. Finally, both hormones bind with a low affinity to serum albumin, but, due to the large availability of albumin, it has a high capacity.

The saturation of binding spots on thyronine-binding globulin (TBG) by endogenous T3 can be estimated by the triiodothyronine resin uptake test. The test is performed by taking a blood sample, to which an excess of radioactive exogenous T3 is added, followed by a resin that also binds T3. A fraction of the radioactive T3 binds to sites on TBG not already occupied by endogenous thyroid hormone, and the remainder binds to the resin. The amount of labeled hormones bound to the resin is then subtracted from the total that was added, with the remainder thus being the amount that was bound to the unoccupied binding sites on TBG.

Effects 
T3 increases the basal metabolic rate and, thus, increases the body's oxygen and energy consumption. The basal metabolic rate is the minimal caloric requirement needed to sustain life in a resting individual. T3 acts on the majority of tissues within the body, with a few exceptions including the spleen. It increases the synthesis and activity of the Na+/K+-ATPase (which normally constitutes a substantial fraction of total cellular ATP expenditure) without disrupting transmembrane ion balance. In general, it increases the turnover of different endogenous macromolecules by increasing their synthesis and degradation.

Skeletal growth 
Thyroid hormones are essential for normal growth and skeletal maturation. They potentiate the effect of growth hormone and somatomedins to promote bone growth, epiphysial closure and bone maturation.

Protein
T3 stimulates the production of RNA polymerase I and II and, therefore, increases the rate of protein synthesis. It also increases the rate of protein degradation, and, in excess, the rate of protein degradation exceeds the rate of protein synthesis. In such situations, the body may go into negative ion balance.

Glucose
T3 potentiates the effects of the β-adrenergic receptors on the metabolism of glucose.  Therefore, it increases the rate of glycogen breakdown and glucose synthesis in gluconeogenesis.

Lipids
T3 stimulates the breakdown of cholesterol and increases the number of LDL receptors, thereby increasing the rate of lipolysis.

Heart
T3 increases the heart rate and force of contraction, thus increasing cardiac output, by increasing β-adrenergic receptor levels in myocardium. This results in increased systolic blood pressure and decreased diastolic blood pressure. The latter two effects act to produce the typical bounding pulse seen in hyperthyroidism.  It also upregulates the thick filament protein myosin, which helps to increase contractility. A helpful clinical measure to assess contractility is the time between the QRS complex and the second heart sound. This is often decreased in hyperthyroidism.

Development
T3 has profound effect upon the developing embryo and infants. It affects the lungs and influences the postnatal growth of the central nervous system. It stimulates the production of myelin, the production of neurotransmitters, and the growth of axons. It is also important in the linear growth of bones.

Neurotransmitters
T3 may increase serotonin in the brain, in particular in the cerebral cortex, and down-regulate 5HT-2 receptors, based on studies in which T3 reversed learned helplessness in rats and physiological studies of the rat brain.

Physiological function
Thyroid hormones act to increase protein turnover. This might serve an adaptive function in regard to long-term calorie restriction with adequate protein. When calories are in short supply, reduction in protein turnover may ameliorate the effects of the shortage.

Measurement

Triiodothyronine can be measured as free triiodothyronine, which is an indicator of triiodothyronine activity in the body. It can also be measured as total triiodothyronine, which also depends on the triiodothyronine that is bound to thyroxine-binding globulin.

Uses

Treatment of depressive disorders 
The addition of triiodothyronine to existing treatments such as SSRIs is one of the most widely studied augmentation strategies for refractory depression, however success may depend on the dosage of T3. A long-term case series study by Kelly and Lieberman of 17 patients with major refractory unipolar depression found that 14 patients showed sustained improvement of symptoms over an average timespan of two years, in some cases with higher doses of T3 than the traditional 50 µg required to achieve therapeutic effect, with an average of 80 µg and a dosage span of 24 months; dose range: 25-150 µg. The same authors published a retrospective study of 125 patients with the two most common categories of bipolar disorders II and NOS whose treatment had previously been resistant to an average of 14 other medications. They found that 84% experienced improvement and 33% experienced full remission over a period of an average of 20.3 (standard deviation of 9.7). None of the patients experienced hypomania while on T3.

Use as a fat loss supplement 
3,5-Diiodo-L-thyronine and 3,3′-diiodo-L-thyronine are used as ingredients in certain over-the-counter fat-loss supplements, designed for bodybuilding. Several studies have shown that these compounds increase the metabolization of fatty acids and the burning of adipose fat tissue in rats.

Alternative medicine 
Triiodothyronine has been used to treat Wilson's syndrome, an alternative medical diagnosis not recognized as a medical condition by mainstream medicine. This diagnosis involves various non-specific symptoms that are attributed to the thyroid, despite normal thyroid function tests. The American Thyroid Association has raised concern that the prescribed treatment with triiodothyronine is potentially harmful.

History 
In 1950 Dr Jack Gross, a Canadian endocrinologist, came to the British National Institute for Medical Research to work with Rosalind Pitt-Rivers as a postdoctoral fellow. Gross had previous experience working at McGill University under Professor Charles Leblond, where they used radioactive iodine to study the physiology of thyroid hormone and applied chromatography to analyze radioiodinated proteins in human blood after radioiodine therapy. Gross and Leblond found an unknown radioactive compound in the blood of rats given radioactive iodine. The compound migrated close to thyroxine in chromatography and they initially named it 'unknown 1' . Around that time a group led by Jean Roche in Paris described a deiodinating activity in the sheep thyroid gland, raising the possibility that 'unknown 1' is the less iodinated analogue of T4, triiodothyronine. In march of 1952 Gross & Pitt-Rivers published a paper in The Lancet titled "THE IDENTIFICATION OF 3:5:3'-L-TRIIODOTHYRONINE IN HUMAN PLASMA.

See also 
 Polar T3 syndrome

 TRC-150094

References

External links
 Triiodothyronine bound to proteins in the PDB
 T3 at Lab Tests Online

Iodinated tyrosine derivatives
Hormones of the thyroid gland
Hormones of the hypothalamus-pituitary-thyroid axis
Human hormones
Toxicology
Thyroid
Thyroid hormone receptor agonists
Diphenyl ethers